Inzlingen is a village in the district of Lörrach in Baden-Württemberg in Germany.

From the Fondation Beyeler, a famous art collection in Riehen in the canton Basel Stadt, Switzerland, the street Inzlingerstrasse goes uphill to Inzlingen. By crossing the border the street is called Riehenstrasse and it ends at the moated castle.

History

The first historical facts date back to 1228. In the region Inzlingen is famous for Inzlingen Castle - its moated castle, which is known since 1511. It includes the town hall of the village and a luxury restaurant.

Politics

Mayor
 Erich Hildebrand (1984–2009)
 Marco Muchenberger (since 2009)

Neighbourhood
Inzlingen is bounded by different municipalities in Germany and Switzerland. In addition it is located at the foothills of the Black Forest.

References

Lörrach (district)
Baden
Germany–Switzerland border crossings